Alexander Shapiro is an A. Russell Chandler III Chair and Professor in H. Milton Stewart School of Industrial and Systems Engineering at Georgia Tech. He was editor-in-chief of the journal Mathematical Programming, Series A and was an area editor of the journal Operations Research. Shapiro graduated with M.Sc. degree in mathematics from Moscow State University in 1971 and ten years later got his Ph.D. in applied mathematics and statistics from Ben-Gurion University of the Negev.

References

External links

20th-century births
Living people
Russian mathematicians
Moscow State University alumni
Ben-Gurion University of the Negev alumni
Georgia Tech faculty
Year of birth missing (living people)
Place of birth missing (living people)